Judge O'Connell may refer to:

Ambrose O'Connell (1881–1962), associate judge of the United States Court of Customs and Patent Appeals
Beverly Reid O'Connell (1965–2017), judge of the United States District Court for the Central District of California
John Joseph O'Connell (1894–1949), judge of the United States Court of Appeals for the Third Circuit

See also
Justice O'Connell (disambiguation)